The European Conservatives Group and Democratic Alliance (EC/DA) is a conservative group in the Parliamentary Assembly of the Council of Europe. It was founded as the Group of Independent Representatives in 1970 by British and Scandinavian members of PACE. It has 76 members from countries including the UK, Austria, Norway, Denmark, Poland, Sweden and Italy.  It was known as the European Democrat Group until its renaming in 2014, and the European Conservatives Group until 2019.

While it was only the third group to be founded in PACE (after the Socialist Group and the Christian Democrat Group), it was the first to have an official secretariat, which was established in 1977. On 6 July 1978, a proposal to rename the group was submitted, leading to the new name in September 1980.

For many years Vladimir Putin's United Russia party were members of the European Democrat Group.

Membership

2022
As of October 2022, the European Conservatives Group and Democratic Alliance has the following members:

2014

As of 23 October 2014, the European Conservatives had the following members:

Unaffiliated members: Ganira Pashayeva, Yuliya L'Ovochkina

See also
 European Democrats

Footnotes

References
Page on the PACE website

European Conservatives Group and Democratic Alliance
Political groups in the Parliamentary Assembly of the Council of Europe
Political organizations based in Europe
Conservatism in Europe

de:Europäische Demokraten#Europäische Demokraten im Europarat